Senator Riggs may refer to:

Jack Riggs (born 1954), Idaho State Senate
Jetur R. Riggs (1809–1869), New Jersey State Senate